Route 30 is a 2007 independent comedy film written by John Putch, and starring Dana Delany, Curtis Armstrong, David DeLuise, Christine Elise, Kevin Rahm and Robert Romanus. Route 30 was released on DVD in the U.S. on Nov. 17, 2009.

Plot

Three interconnecting stories about some rural folks in South Central Pennsylvania. First film in the Route 30 Trilogy. 'Deer Hunters' Wives' tells of the frustrations of Civil War tour guide Mandy (Nathalie Boltt), who obsesses on Jennie Wade, the only civilian killed at the Battle of Gettysburg. While her friend June (Christine Elise McCarthy) struggles with an internet porn scheme to make extra money. 'What I Believe' focuses on a man (Kevin Rahm) who seeks the help of a Christian Scientist (Wil Love) to heal his back pain and explain the Big Foot that chased him down the mountainside. 'Original Bill' is the story of a writer (David DeLuise) who buys a farmhouse in the country in hopes to find unique inspiration to write his novel. He is sidetracked by his Amish neighbor (Dana Delany), who smokes, drinks, swears and watches his TV.

Cast
 Dana Delany as Amish Martha
 Curtis Armstrong as Ned
 David DeLuise as Original Bill
 Christine Elise McCarthy as June
 Kevin Rahm as Arden
 Robert Romanus as Stive
 Nathalie Boltt as Mandy
 David Cowgill as Tork
 Alicia Fusting as Golfer Gal
 Wil Love as Henry
 Lee Wilkof as Rotten Egg

Production notes
The character of Original Bill is based on the director's father, Bill, and his summer theater. The elder Putch was the husband of actress Jean Stapleton and teacher of actresses Shirley Jones.

Route 30 is the first film in a trilogy.

References

External links 
 
 

2007 films
2007 comedy films
American independent films
American comedy films
Bigfoot films
Films directed by John Putch
2007 independent films
2000s English-language films
2000s American films